Luis Omedes Sistachs (24 August 1897 – 8 January 1970) was a Spanish rower. He competed in two events at the 1924 Summer Olympics.

References

External links
 

1897 births
1970 deaths
Spanish male rowers
Olympic rowers of Spain
Rowers at the 1924 Summer Olympics
Rowers from Barcelona